Brooker Creek Headwaters Nature Preserve is located in northwest Hillsborough County, Florida and is managed by the Southwest Florida Water Management District. The  area is located at 18102 Ramblewood Road in Lutz, Florida and offers hiking opportunities. It protects wetlands and headwaters of the Brooker Creek watershed.

References

External links
Brooker Creek Watershed website

Protected areas of Hillsborough County, Florida
Southwest Florida Water Management District reserves